Bratków  is a village in the administrative district of Gmina Bogatynia, within Zgorzelec County, Lower Silesian Voivodeship, in south-western Poland. It is located in a Polish salient between the Czech Republic and Germany.

History
In the Early Middle Ages, Bratków was a stronghold of the Bieżuńczanie tribe, one of the Polish tribes. Since the 11th century, the settlement was under Polish, Czech, Hungarian and Saxon rule, and from 1871 to 1945 it was also part of Germany. After the defeat of Germany in World War II in 1945, it became again part of Poland.

Gallery

References

Villages in Zgorzelec County